Birstall may refer to:

 Birstall, Leicestershire, a large village and civil parish
 Birstall, West Yorkshire, a large village in the metropolitan borough of Kirklees

See also
 Burstall (disambiguation)